The 2014 in Indian sports was held across the Indian cities all through the season.

Events

January
 30 December – 5 January: 2014 Aircel Chennai Open was scheduled. Stanislas Wawrinka of Switzerland beat Frenchman Édouard Roger-Vasselin by 7–5, 6–2 in men's singles final and became the champion and in the men's doubles final Sweden's Johan Brunström and Frederik Nielsen of Denmark beat the Croatian pair Marin Draganja and Mate Pavić 6–2, 4–6, [10–7].
 10–18 January: 2012–14 Men's FIH Hockey World League Final was held at Dhyan Chand National Stadium, Delhi. The Dutch hockey team beat the Black Stick Men 7–2 in the final.
 18–29 January: 2014 Lusophony Games was held in Goa, India. Host India ended up on first place with 37 Gold, 27 Silver and 28 Bronze followed by Portugal with 18 Gold, 20 Silver and 12 Bronze and Macau on third place with 15 Gold, 9 Silver and 14 Bronze.
 21–26 January: 2014 India Open Grand Prix Gold was held at Babu Banarasi Das Indoor Stadium in Lucknow.

February
 23 January – 23 February: 2014 Hockey India League is scheduled. Kalinga Lancers was the debuting team. Delhi Waveriders became the champions by beating Jaypee Punjab Warriors. The scores were leveled at 3–3 but Delhi took the game in penalties 3–1. Defending champions Ranchi Rhinos ended up 3rd after beating Uttar Pradesh Wizards 3–2 in penalties after the game was drawn 1–1.
 31 January – 2 February: 2014 Davis Cup Asia/Oceania Zone Group I first round match India vs Chinese Taipei was played at Indore, India winning 5–0.
 2 February: 2013–14 Ranji Trophy final was scheduled to end. Karnataka won the match by 7 wickets by beating Maharashtra.
 7–11 February: First round of I-League 2nd Division was held. Royal Wahingdoh F.C. and Kalighat Milan Sangha F.C. made to final round from group A and Bhawanipore F.C. and Hindustan F.C. made it to final round from group B

March
 23 March – 11 April: I-League 2nd Division Final Round was held. Royal Wahingdoh F.C. won the round and advanced to 2014–15 I-League 1st Division.

April
 1–6 April: 2014 India Super Series was held at Siri Fort Indoor Stadium, New Delhi.
 16 April – 1 June: 2014 Indian Premier League is scheduled.
 22 April: Chitra Magimairaj won the World Women's Senior Snooker Championship on 22 April 2014 at Leeds, United Kingdom.
 30 April: Last match of 2014 Indian Premier League will be played in the United Arab Emirates. The remaining season will return to India.

May
 2 May: 2014 Indian Premier League returns to India.
 18 May: 2013–14 I-League matches ends.
 18–25 May: Thomas cup and Uber cup of Badminton were scheduled in New Delhi. Japan and China won Thomas and Uber Cups, respectively.

June
 1 June: 2014 Indian Premier League final match was held at M. Chinnaswamy Stadium in Bangalore. Kolkata Knight Riders beat Kings XI Punjab by 3 wickets to win their second title.

September
 10–18 September: 2014 World University Squash Championship will be held in Chennai.
 12–14 September: 2014 Davis Cup World Group Play-offs will be held in KSLTA Tennis Stadium, Bangalore. India to face Serbia to qualify for group stage.
 2014 Indian Super League season will kick off.

October
 30 September – 15 October: 2014 Indian Badminton League is scheduled.

November
 2014 Indian Super League season will end.

December
 13–21 December: 2014 Men's Hockey Champions Trophy will be held at Kalinga Stadium, Bhubaneshwar.
 2014–15 I-League season begins.

Sports leagues in 2014

National leagues

Continental leagues

India in 2014 international sports

Multi-sport event

Association football
 Clubs
2014 AFC Cup: Pune F.C. finished fourth in group H. Churchill Brothers reached knock out stage to round of 16.

 International seasons
 2013–14 in Indian football
 2014–15 in Indian football

Badminton
 Championships
2014 Thomas and Uber Cup was scheduled to be held in New Delhi, India.

Basketball

Cricket
 Tournaments
2014 Asia Cup in Bangladesh. India finished on 3rd place after they lost to Pakistan and Sri Lanka in group stage. Sri Lanka won the tournament by beating  in the final match.
2014 ICC World Twenty20 in Bangladesh. India was unbeaten till semi-final match when they evolved and the deserving champions. But  beat India in final to win the world T20 champions title. India eventually finished as runners-up.
2014 ICC Women's World Twenty20 in Bangladesh. India finished 3rd in group stage. India played Pakistan in 2016 ICC Women's World Twenty20 Qualification playoff where India beat Pakistan and qualified for 2016 ICC Women's World Twenty20 scheduled to take place in India.

 Tours
India faced New Zealand. India lost four out of five ODIs and one out of two test matches losing One Day series 4–0 and Test series 1–0 to New Zealand Black Caps (Kiwis) which are a comparatively weaker team to India.
India will face England

Field hockey
 Tournaments
2012–14 Men's FIH Hockey World League Final in New Delhi, India was won by the Netherlands. India ended up on sixth position after losing to Belgium 2–1.
2014 Men's Hockey World Cup in The Hague, Netherlands.
2014 Men's Hockey Champions Trophy in Bhubaneshwar, India.

Tennis
 Grand Slam

 Championships
2014 Davis Cup Asia/Oceania Zone Group I first round match India vs Chinese Taipei was held in Indore, India. Host India beat Chinese Taipei by 5–0.
2014 Davis Cup Asia/Oceania Zone Group I second round match India vs South Korea was held in Busan, South Korea. India beat host South Korea 3–1 to enter the 2014 Davis Cup World Group Play-offs against Serbia.
2014 Davis Cup World Group Play-offs match host India against Serbia. Winner will qualify for 2015 Davis Cup World Group.

See also
 2014 in India

References